Nigina Amonkulova (born 30 January 1986) is a Tajik folk singer, who performs in traditional dress. Tajik state television is nicknamed "Nigina TV" due to her frequent appearances. She sings traditional Persian songs from Iran and Afghanistan as well.

Biography
Amonkulova was born on 30 January 1986 in Panjakent, Leninabad. Nigina has four brothers: Khursed, a businessman; Khusrav, a singer; Khayyam, a wood-carver; Hamidjon. She graduated from № 1 Panjakent High School and went on to study for the three years at the Medical College in Pankakent. During her time at school and university she won several singing competitions.

Career 
Amonqulova's music became popular in 2008 with the success of the song “Ranjida nigoram omad”. Her music is described as "pop-folk" and she often performs in brightly coloured national costumes. Collaborators include Sirojiddin Fozilov, Saidkul Bilolov, Sharif Bedakov, Farhod Zikir and Adiba Aziz. In 2020, she filmed the video for her single 'Dario' in the Darvaz Nature Reserve. Tajik television is sometimes called "Nigina TV" due to her frequent appearances on it.

References 

1986 births
Living people
People from Sughd Region
21st-century Tajikistani women singers
Tajik-language singers